The Hughes XV-9 (company designation Hughes Model 385) was a 1960s American high-speed research helicopter built by Hughes Helicopters.

Design and development
The Model 385 was designed and built under a United States Army research contract to prove a concept known as hot-cycle propulsion. The helicopter was given the military designation XV-9A with the serial number 64-15107. Two General Electric YT64-GE-6 turbojets were used as gas generators, the jet efflux was ducted to nozzles at the blade tips. The rotor blades also had cooling ducts in both the leading and trailing edges. To keep costs to a minimum the cockpit with two side-by-side seats of an OH-6A was used and the landing gear was from a Sikorsky H-34.

Operational service
The helicopter first flew on November 5, 1964. After test flight at Hughes facility at Culver City, California, the XV-9A was transferred to Edwards Air Force Base for further tests. The tests were satisfactory and the company was confident that the hot-cycle system would be widely used, although the XV-9A was noisy and had a high fuel consumption. The company was unable to mitigate the problems and the development by Hughes of pressure-jet systems did not proceed. The Army tests were completed in August 1965 and the helicopter was returned to Hughes.

Variants
XV-9A
United States military designation for the Hughes Model 385, one built.

Specifications (XV-9A)

See also

 Tip jet

References

 

1960s United States experimental aircraft
1960s United States helicopters
V-09
V-tail aircraft
Twin-turbine helicopters
Aircraft first flown in 1964
Tipjet-powered helicopters